Myrskyntuoja is the third studio album by the Finnish heavy metal band Teräsbetoni.

It entered the Finnish Album Chart at number 1.

Track listing
Voiman vartijat (4:26) ('Guardians of Power')
Painajainen (4:13) ('Nightmare')
Missä miehet ratsastaa (3:55) ('Where the Men Ride')
Ukkoshevonen (3:19) ('Thunderhorse')
Orjakaleeri (5:24) ('Slave Galley')
Paha sanoo (3:56) ('Evil Says')
Teräksen taakka (5:27) ('The Burden of Steel')
Metallin voima (4:10) ('The Strength of Metal')
Kuumilla porteilla (4:24) ('At The Hot Gates')
Vihollisille (3:52) ('For Enemies')
Huominen tulla jo saa (5:15) ('Tomorrow May Come')
Seiso suorassa (4:49) ('Stand Straight')

Personnel
 Jarkko Ahola - lead vocals, bass
 Arto Järvinen - guitar, vocals on "Kuumilla porteilla"
 Jari Kuokkanen - drums
 Viljo Rantanen - guitar

2008 albums
Teräsbetoni albums